St. Paul's Episcopal Church  is an historic red brick  Gothic Revival church located at 210 Lauderdale Street in Selma, Dallas County, Alabama, United States.  The parish was established in 1838 and its original sanctuary building was burned on April 2, 1865 during the Battle of Selma, with credit for that act going to Union General James H. Wilson.  The current building was designed by the famous New York City architectural firm of Richard Upjohn and was completed in 1875.

The interior features several Tiffany stained glass windows designed by parishioner and Selma  native, Clara Weaver Parrish, who was a noted artist who worked for Tiffany Studios in New York.

St. Paul's Episcopal Church was added to the National Register of Historic Places on March 25, 1975.

St. Paul's Episcopal Church is a parish in the Episcopal Diocese of Alabama. The Rev. Jack Alvey is currently serving as the twenty second rector.

See also

National Register of Historic Places listings in Dallas County, Alabama

References

External links

 St. Paul's Selma website

Churches completed in 1875
Towers completed in 1875
National Register of Historic Places in Dallas County, Alabama
Churches on the National Register of Historic Places in Alabama
Episcopal church buildings in Alabama
Gothic Revival church buildings in Alabama
Richard Upjohn church buildings
Towers in Alabama
Bell towers in the United States
Buildings and structures in Selma, Alabama
Religious organizations established in 1838
1838 establishments in Alabama
19th-century Episcopal church buildings